Jean-Frédéric Osterwald (or Ostervald) (25 November 1663 – 14 April 1747) was a Protestant pastor from Neuchâtel (now in Switzerland).

Life
He was born at Neuchâtel in 1663 in a patrician family, a son of the Reformed pastor Johann Rudolf Ostervald. He was educated at Zürich and at Saumur (where he graduated), studied theology at Orléans under Claude Pajon, at Paris under Jean Claude and at Geneva under Louis Tronchin (de), and was ordained to the ministry in his native place in 1683.

He spent most of his life at Neuchâtel, first as a deacon, then from 1699 a pastor, and finally he was elected deacon. Besides this he gave lectures at the academy of theology. As preacher, pastor, lecturer and author, he attained a position of great influence in his day, he and his friends, J. A. Turretini of Geneva and S. Werenfels (1657-1740) of Basel, forming what was once called the Swiss triumvirate.

In matters of theology, Ostervald thought to show a leaning towards Socinianism and embraced Arminianism, emphasizing the freewill of the man.

His innovative proposals embraced dogmatics, exegesis (his important adaptation of a translation of, and commentary on the Bible), liturgy (Bible reading instead of preaching), hymnology and moral theology (importance of good deeds and moral life). His writings had a great influence, bearing spiritual renewal among Waldensian, Dutch, German, Hungarian and Scandinavian Protestants. Moreover, the English Royal Society for the Propagation of the Gospel in Foreign Parts – of which he was a member – brought his teachings to the countries of the Middle East, India, Canada and the West-Indian Islands. His highly influential oeuvre was later called "the second Reformation".

In August 1746 he had a stroke in the pulpit. He died in Neuchâtel on 14 April 1747 after 61 years of service. His pastor's office was inherited by his son Jean Rodolphe (1687-1764).

Works
Ostervald's major works are:

Traité des sources de la corruption qui regne aujourd'huy parmi les chrétiens (1700), translated into English, Dutch and German, Hungarian practically a plea for a more ethical and less doctrinal type of Christianity; 
Catéchisme ou instruction dans la religion chrétienne (1702), also translated into English, Dutch and German; 
Traité contre l'impureté (1707); 
Sermons sur divers textes (1722-1724); 
Theologiae compendium (1739); and 
Traduction de la Bible (1724).

All his writings were popular among French Protestants; many were translated into various languages; Ostervald's Bible, a revision of the French translation, in particular, was well known in Great Britain.

Notes and references

Citations

Sources

External links
 La Sainte Bible, Lire l'Ostervald Frossard en ligne!  – online version of Ostervald's Bible, hosted on Ostervald-Frossard.net, complete with search engine and lite, efficient browsing
The Archives of the State of Neuchâtel hold collections related to Jean-Frédéric Ostervald:
 .This collection contains the archives of the society of Neuchâtel pastors and ministers (from the 13th to the 19th century) including Jean-Frédéric Ostervald.
 This collection contains mainly particular acts, correspondence, and a small iconographic collection of Ostervald's family.

1663 births
1747 deaths
18th-century Calvinist and Reformed ministers
18th-century Calvinist and Reformed theologians
Arminian ministers
Arminian theologians
People from Neuchâtel